Chaucer Group is an international specialty insurance and reinsurance group. They are headquartered in London, with international hubs for Europe, MENA, Bermuda, Latin America and Asia.  Chaucer was acquired by China Reinsurance (Group) Corporation (China Re) in 2018.

Chaucer clients can underwrite their risk through Lloyd's of London or through their insurance company in Dublin.

Business written

Chaucer currently manages two Syndicates at Lloyd's – Composite 1084 and Nuclear 1176 which together underwrite over 45 major classes of business.

References

Insurance companies of the United Kingdom